Adrian Brown (30 April 1929 - 27 April 2019) was a British theatre, television director and poet. He was nominated for a BAFTA with Peter Griffiths for his direction of The Caucasian Chalk Circle in 1985 and won an International Emmy for Thames TV in 1987 for an adaptation of William Luce's The Belle of Amherst starring Claire Bloom. He directed the world premiere of Less Than Kind by Terence Rattigan at the Jermyn Street Theatre, which was staged in early 2011. He has published two volumes of verse, and holds the title of the Grand Master of the Knights of Verse of the Eccentric Club.

Personal life
While an undergraduate at Exeter College, Oxford, Brown first met Terence Rattigan. They met again in Paris three years later and were to become lovers throughout the 1950s.

References

External links
 Peoplesbookprize.com
 A conversation with Adrian Brown in the Rattigan Society magazine

1929 births
2019 deaths
Emmy Award winners
British poets
British theatre directors
British television directors
Alumni of Exeter College, Oxford
Writers from London
British male poets